Robert William "Bobby" Ash (November 5, 1925 – May 20, 2007) was an English-born Canadian actor who became known to children in the Toronto area as Uncle Bobby the host of The Uncle Bobby Show on local station CFTO-TV.

Early years
Robert Ash was born in Walsall, England into a family of actors and was brought up in the "pirate" circuses of Britain. Ash's entertainment career began as a child actor with a role in No Mother to Guide Her. During World War II, Ash performed for the British Forces in Stars in Battledress. Ash also worked as a comedy performer and circus clown.

Moving to Canada
After immigrating to Canada (leaving his parents and an unknown woman), Ash answered an ad for a television role as a clown in the CFTO program The Professor's Hideaway in 1959. He appeared on CFTO when it began broadcasting in 1961.  (The character of Kiddo later went on to his own show, with a different actor.) After Ash left his first show, he returned to Britain, but returned shortly to Canada to create a new program for CFTO (from 1962 to 1979). Ash took early education course at Seneca College to help his work on television.

Retirement and Death
Even after retirement Ash continued to live in Toronto (Guildwood)  and worked on children's books.

Ash later moved north to Elliot Lake from Toronto and died there of a heart attack on May 20, 2007.

Bibliography

References

External links
 
 
 

1924 births
2007 deaths
People from Walsall
Canadian children's television personalities
People from Elliot Lake
Male actors from Toronto
British emigrants to Canada
Seneca College alumni